The following list is of the completed works of British-Canadian architect Peter Dickinson.

References

Martins-Manteiga, John. Peter Dickinson. Toronto: Dominion Modern, 2010.

Architecture in Canada by city